Cleeve Hill (also known as Cleeve Cloud) is the highest point both of the Cotswolds hill range and of the county of Gloucestershire, at . It is located on Cleeve Common which is a Site of Special Scientific Interest (SSSI) looked after by a small charity called Cleeve Common Trust (formally Cleeve Common Board of Conservators). It commands a clear view to the west, over Cheltenham and the racecourse, over the River Severn and into Wales; and to the north over Winchcombe.  It is a conspicuous outcrop on the edge of the limestone escarpment, (sometimes called the "Cotswold Edge"). It is crossed by the Cotswold Way footpath.

With the hill's south slopes draining to the River Coln, Cleeve Hill is the highest point in the drainage basin of the River Thames.

Summit and views
Because of this, it does not offer particularly wide-ranging views. On an exceptionally clear day (for example a sunny day following a day of rain in spring or early summer), the view extends an impressive  to Winsford Hill on Exmoor, Somerset.

Hill fort and rock faces
Close to the summit is the Neolithic long barrow, Belas Knap. On its western scarp is an Iron Age hill fort.

The Hill bears one of the few rock faces in the area, Castle Rock, which is sound enough for rock-climbing. The routes are short, difficult for their grade and highly polished.

Golf course and Cleeve Common
The Hill has been home to a golf course since 1891. The course was the location of the 2010 Wells Cup that took place in June of that year.

Cleeve Common, which is sited on Cleeve Hill, is a designated Site of Special Scientific Interest by Natural England and is recorded in the List of Sites of Special Scientific Interest in Gloucestershire.

Routes to the highest point 

From the south, a road for car access ends very close to the summit trig point, which is a short walk from the parking area. This can be reached from Cheltenham via Ham Hill and Aggs Hill, or from the village of Whittington, Gloucestershire.

To the north and to reach the more favourable view point, a minor road leads off the B4632 to the golf course where there is free parking in a disused quarry. From this point, the viewpoint is roughly a half-mile ascent on foot.

There are numerous other ways to reach the hill, and there is a well-maintained network of paths and tracks crossing it in many directions.  Ordnance Survey maps show all routes, paths and rights of way as well as the best viewpoints.

See also
Broadway Tower - at the second highest point of the Cotswolds

References

External links
 Official Cleeve Common Website
 Computer Generated Summit Panorama Index

Marilyns of England
Hills of Gloucestershire
Hill forts in Gloucestershire
Cotswolds
Highest points of English counties
Mountains and hills of the United Kingdom with toposcopes